Alfaz-e-Mewat FM 107.8 (Rural Voices of Mewat) is a community radio station established in 2012 by S M Sehgal Foundation with seed funding from the Ministry of Agriculture, Government of India, under its Agricultural Technology Management Agency scheme.
The radio station is located in a community center in the village of Ghaghas in Haryana, India.

Villagers, schoolchildren, and local artists take part in radio programs and interviews. Community members manage the station as technicians, producers, and facilitators. In areas without radio signals, villagers listen and participate by calling a toll-free number.

Listener Community 
The Mewat region, now called Nuh, served by Alfaz-e-Mewat has been identified by the Ministry of Minority Affairs as a "minority-concentrated backward district" with problems in basic areas such as water availability, agricultural production, health, literacy, and a lack of awareness about government entitlements and services. Most people in the region are Meo Muslims, a unique and distinct composite culture. Because women are often isolated at home in these rural communities, community radio provides "a window to the outside world" as well as a tool for the empowerment of women and girls.

Programs 
Alfaz-e-Mewat FM 107.8 broadcasts 13 hours a day, seven days a week, to households in more than 225 villages. Information and communications technologies increase program reach outside the immediate geographic coverage area. Narrowcasting collects program feedback and facilitates community dialogue. Live streaming, mobile apps, and podcasts provide program content access to and from anywhere in the world.

Villagers hear about and discuss best practices in water management and conservation, health and sanitation, education, agriculture, environmental awareness, and rural governance. 
Awareness campaigns and programs discuss social issues that affect citizens. 
Oral folklore, poetry, music, and storytelling programs showcase cultural heritage, history, and people of the area.
Women broadcasters invite women to take part in conversations about local issues.
Educational programs that cater to children include Galli Galli Sim Sim (the Indian adaptation of Sesame Street) and Radio School tutoring in science, math, and English.
In daily interviews, experts and others share their experiences and achievements in varied walks of life.
Listeners' needs are shared with government administrative services.
Programming is shared with other community radio stations.

Alfaz-e-Mewat won the Manthan Award for community broadcasting in 2015. Alfaz-e-Mewat's founder representative Pooja O. Murada has co-authored a book 'Community Radio in India' with Dr. R Sreedher, radio expert, published by Aakar and supported by UNESCO New Delhi Cluster Office.

References

External links 
•*
•*
•*
•https://www.youthkiawaaz.com/2017/07/full-on-nikki-and-yourstoryteller-series-for-teenage-girls-and-children/ (July 2017)
•http://www.hindustantimes.com/delhi-news/mewat-s-community-radio-alfaz-e-mewat-gives-a-powerful-voice-to-the-unheard/story-CR3h1sS82HQpB18cVp3o9K.html (September 2017)
•http://www.thestatesman.com/features/for-the-people-by-the-people-1502496116.html (September 2017)
•https://feminisminindia.com/2017/10/06/anuradha-alfaz-e-mewat/ (October 2017)
•http://www.thestatesman.com/books-education/i-we-and-the-bridge-1502528891.html (November 2017)

Organisations based in Haryana
Radio stations established in 2012
Radio stations in Haryana
Mewat
2012 establishments in Haryana